St. Michaels Bay (also St. Michael Bay) is a natural bay on the coast of Labrador in the province of Newfoundland and Labrador, Canada. 

The port of Charlottetown is situated near the western end of the bay.

References

Bays of Newfoundland and Labrador